Kalunga is a rural locality in the Tablelands Region, Queensland, Australia.

Geography
The Wild River forms a small part of the eastern boundary before flowing through to the south-west. Basalt Creek forms the south-western boundary before joining the Wild.

Road infrastructure
Longlands Gap Road (State Route 52) runs along part of the eastern boundary. The Herberton Petford Road runs along most of the north-eastern boundary.

References 

Tablelands Region
Localities in Queensland